The Brooklyn No. 4 Fire House is located in Oshkosh, Wisconsin.

History
The fire house was designed by William Waters and built in 1868, after major fires in 1859 and 1866. By the time it closed in 1946, #4 spanned the transitions from volunteer firemen to professionals, from mobile pumps to hose wagons, and from horses to motorized trucks.

Later, the building housed a sign company for a time. It was added to the State Register of Historic Places in 1995 and to the National Register of Historic Places the following year.

References

Fire stations on the National Register of Historic Places in Wisconsin
Commercial buildings on the National Register of Historic Places in Wisconsin
National Register of Historic Places in Winnebago County, Wisconsin
Buildings and structures in Oshkosh, Wisconsin
Italianate architecture in Wisconsin
Brick buildings and structures
Buildings and structures completed in 1868